Charles Richard Morris may refer to:

 Charles Morris (Australian politician) (1863–1918), timber merchant and politician in South Australia
 Charles Morris (cricketer, born 1880) (1880–1947), English cricketer
 Charlie Morris (footballer) (1880–1952), English footballer
 Charles Morris, Baron Morris of Grasmere (1898–1990), academic philosopher and Vice-Chancellor of the University of Leeds
 Charles Morris (British politician) (1926–2012), British Labour politician
 Charles R. Morris (1939–2021), American lawyer, banker, and author.